Beinir Sigmundsson (10th century – c. 970) was a chieftain in the Faroe Islands. 

Beinir was the son of Sigmund the Elder. He was from Skúvoy. He ruled over half the archipelago with his brother Brestir Sigmundsson. Together with Tóra he had the child Tóri Beinirsson. Beinir and his brother were eventually murdered in 970 by rival chieftains Svínoyar-Bjarni and Havgrímur when they stayed at a farm on the island Stóra Dímun.

References

Other Sources
German Wikipedia article :de:Beinir Sigmundsson

10th-century Faroese people
10th-century rulers in Europe
970 deaths
Year of birth unknown